The Boletim do Instituto Vasco da Gama was the official monthly review of the Instituto Vasco da Gama founded in Goa in 1871 by Tomás António Ribeiro Ferreira, better known as Tomás Ribeiro.

The Instituto Vasco da Gama
The Instituto Vasco da Gama was the first initiative to promote and support science and letters in Goa. It was assigned a building for its headquarters, and financial support for publishing a monthly review bearing the name of the institute. Renovated in 1924, the Instituto Vasco da Gama promoted a golden age of Indo-Portuguese literature in the areas of scholarly writing, journalism, history and poetry. After the liberation of Goa and its incorporation into India, the Institute was renamed Instituto Menezes Bragança, in honour of the journalist and Indian nationalist Luís de Menezes Bragança. The Boletim do Instituto Vasco da Gama was also renamed Boletim do Instituto Menezes Bragança.

Publication details
The review was published by Tipografia Rangel, Bastora, Goa, beginning with vol. 1 (1926) and going up to vol. 78 (1960).

Holdings
 The Biblioteca Geral da Universidade de Coimbra possesses what appears to be a complete set. This collection is available in digital form at Memorias de Africa.
 Central Library, Panjim, Goa.
 Xavier Centre for Historical Research, Alto Porvorim, Goa possesses the following issues: 1926-1961. The issues seem to be badly damaged, and so are not easily given out.

References

External links
 WorldCat Record

Defunct magazines published in India
Magazines established in 1871
Magazines with year of disestablishment missing
Monthly magazines published in India
Portuguese-language magazines